Crowley's tiger (Parantica crowleyi) is a species of nymphalid butterfly in the Danainae subfamily. It is found in Brunei, Indonesia, and Malaysia.

References

Parantica
Butterflies described in 1894
Butterflies of Asia
Taxonomy articles created by Polbot